Haralambie Dumitraș (born 11 February 1960), also known as Hari Dumitraș, is a Romanian former rugby union player and current coach. He played as number eight.

Professional career
He played for Section Paloise and RC Strasbourg in France.

Dumitraș was a leading name for Romania during the "Golden Era" of the 1980s. He had 47 caps, from 1984 to 1993, scoring 7 tries, 30 points in aggregate. He was the captain in 13 games. He was called for the 1987 Rugby World Cup, playing in two games, without scoring, and for the 1991 Rugby World Cup, playing in all the three games and scoring a try in the 17-15 win over Fiji at 12 October 1991.

After finishing his player career, he became a coach. He settled in France, where he was one of the two head coaches of CA Périgueux. He afterwards went to coach Entente Astarac Bigorre XV, RC Strasbourg and US Argelésienne, since 2009/10.

He was for a short period of time the head coach of Romania national team in 2012, and now is the head of Romanian Rugby Federation.

Personal life
His son, Iulian Dumitraș, is also a professional rugby union player following his father's footspeps, and was a member of Romania's national team, playing at the 2007 and 2011 Rugby World Cups.

References

External links

1960 births
Living people
Romanian rugby union players
Romania international rugby union players
Romanian rugby union coaches
Section Paloise players
Rugby union number eights
Barbarian F.C. players
Romanian expatriate rugby union players
Expatriate rugby union players in France
Romanian expatriate sportspeople in France
Romania national rugby union team coaches
Presidents of the Romanian Rugby Federation